Mount Phillips is a mainly ice-covered mountain rising to about  lying about  west of Mount Alberts, situated in the southern portion of the Malta Plateau, on the Borchgrevink Coast, named for Anglo-Norwegian explorer Carsten Borchgrevink (1864–1934), marking the western extremity of Victoria Land, Antarctica. The mountain was first discovered in January 1841 by Sir James Clark Ross who so named the mountain for professor John Phillips, assistant secretary of the British Association.

References
 http://geographic.org/geographic_names/antname.php?uni=11721&fid=antgeo_118

Phillips